Choe Deok-geun (also spelled Choi Duck-keun or Choi Duk-gun; born November 2, 1942 ; died 1 October 1996 in Vladivostok, Primorsky Krai, Russia) was a South Korean consular official for the Russian Far East who was assassinated by poison in October 1996.

Assassination
Though the official cause of Choe's death was listed as bludgeoning, he had two pencil-sized holes on his torso which suggested injection of a foreign substance into his body. When his corpse was discovered, he still had $1,200 cash in his pocket. It emerged soon after that he had poison in his bloodstream of the same type as that carried by a North Korean submarine which had infiltrated South Korean waters and landed near Gangneung, Gangwon the previous month; North Korea had threatened to retaliate for the killings of their special forces agents by the South Korean Army. North Korea denied all involvement and accused the South of fabricating evidence in order to frame the North. Some news reports at the time suggested that the North Koreans had hired a Russian Mafia hitman to actually carry out the murder.

Aftermath
As a result of his death, South Korea's Ministry of Foreign Affairs and Trade allegedly instructed their personnel to refrain from contacting with or providing assistance to North Koreans in Russia, even refugees, for fear that they too could be murdered. Some analysts believe that the North Korean government chose to delay announcing their 24 August arrest and detention of American citizen Evan Hunziker until around the time of Choe's murder in an attempt to divert attention.

References

1950s births
1996 deaths
Assassinated diplomats
Assassinated South Korean people
Deaths by poisoning
People murdered in Russia
South Korean diplomats
South Korean expatriates in Russia
South Korean people murdered abroad
North Korea–South Korea relations